Fedir Samoilov is a Ukrainian sport climber. He participated at the 2021 IFSC Climbing World Championships, being awarded the bronze medal in the men's combined event. Samoilov was one of the finalists at the World University Sport Climbing Championships in 2018.

See also 
List of grade milestones in rock climbing
History of rock climbing
Rankings of most career IFSC gold medals

References

External links 

Living people
Place of birth missing (living people)
Year of birth missing (living people)
IFSC Climbing World Championships medalists
Ukrainian rock climbers
21st-century Ukrainian people